Nicolas Antoine Coulon, chevalier de Villiers was born in 1683, and died in 1733. He was an officer in New France.

Biography 

Born in Brittany and baptized March 20, 1683 in Nantes, he was the son of Raoul-Guillaume Coulon, sieur de Villiers and Louise de Lafosse (m.1677, Beaumont-sur-Oise). Nicolas Antoine arrived in Quebec in 1703. In 1705, he married Angelique Jarret de Verchères (daughter of François Jarret de Verchères and Marie Perrot and sister Madeleine) in Quebec. At some time before 1718, Nicolas may have married Mme de La Chesaigne.

In 1715, he became lieutenant in the French army. From 1725 to 1730, Nicolas was officer in command of Fort Saint Joseph. From this fort, he conducted in August 1730, a regiment of Canadiens and Amerindians against Fort Mesquakie of the Fox, constructed 60 leagues south of Lake Michigan, and joined the forces of Canadians at Fort Chartres and Fort Miami to prepare for the extermination of this tribe. In January 1731, the survivors of this campaign went to Nicolas Antoine at Fort Saint-Joseph, and later in the year, they accompanied them to Montreal, where Governor Marquis de Beauharnois forgave them. (The writings of de Montigny at Michilimackinac). From 1731 until his death - he was killed by a Sauk in September 1733 - he commanded and rebuilt the fort at La Baye in the Wisconsin.

Children 
He had 7 sons of whom 4 followed in his footsteps. He also had 6 daughters.
 Nicolas Antoine II Coulon de Villiers (1708-1750), won the Battle of Grand Pré
 Louis Coulon de Villiers (1710-1757), won the Battle of Fort Necessity
 François Coulon de Villiers (1712-1794), fought in the Battle of Fort Duquesne 
 Joseph Coulon de Jumonville (1718-1754), killed at the Battle of Jumonville Glen

External links 
Jean-Guy Pelletier, Biographie from Dictionary of Canadian Biography on line

References 

1683 births
1733 deaths
People of New France